Iukit Mo Sa Bala is a 1994 Philippine action film directed by Pepe Marcos. The film stars Bong Revilla, Gabby Concepcion, Nanette Medved and Mat Ranillo III.

Cast

 Bong Revilla as Dr. Roberto 'Bobby' Guerrero
 Gabby Concepcion as Rico Velez
 Nanette Medved as Noemi
 Mat Ranillo III as Vice Mayor Mario Ocampo
 Luis Gonzales as Mayor Roman Guerrero
 Marita Zobel as Norma Guerrero
 Lito Legaspi as Cong. Velez
 Kevin Delgado as Edmond Velez
 Edgar Mande as Rayland Velez
 Fredmoore delos Santos as Paolo Guerrero
 King Gutierrez as Simon
 Renato del Prado as Julian
 Brando Legaspi as Alex
 Tony Mabesa as Padre Celso
 Romy Romulo as Chief
 Rommel Valdez as Torralba
 Perla Bautista as Noemi's Mother

Production
Bong Revilla, who co-produced the film, stated that the film has a bigger budget than Ronquillo, his first film with Star Cinema. Nanette Medved decided to finish shooting the film after she backed out from a film produced by Carlo J. Caparas due to scheduling conflicts.

Release
The film was slated to be released in early July. However, it didn't push through because of Gabby Concepcion and Nanette Medved's involvement in the 1994 Manila Film Festival scam, resulting to them being temporarily banned from the theaters. It was finally released in September.

References

External links

Official Website

1994 films
1994 action films
Filipino-language films
Philippine action films
Star Cinema films
Megavision Films films